Robert Glen "Hogan" Wharton (December 13, 1935 – October 8, 2008) was an American football player.  He attended the University of Houston where he played college football at the tackle position for the Houston Cougars football team from 1956 to 1958.  He was named lineman of the year in the Missouri Valley Conference in 1957, and the following year he was selected by the American Football Coaches Association as a first-team tackle on its 1958 College Football All-America Team. Wharton later played professional football in the newly formed American Football League, playing at the guard position for the Houston Oilers during the first four years of the club's existence from 1960 to 1963, including the 1960 Houston Oilers team that won the first AFL championship. He was cut by the Oilers in September 1964.

References

1935 births
2008 deaths
American football tackles
Houston Cougars football players
Houston Oilers players
Players of American football from Texas
People from Hood County, Texas
American Football League players